Jesús "Chuy" Rasgado (1907–1948) was a Mexican singer-songwriter from Oaxaca. He is particularly known for writing the popular song "Naila".

References

Mexican male singer-songwriters
1907 births
1948 deaths
Mexican people of Spanish descent
Singers from Oaxaca
20th-century Mexican male singers